Simon Chinn is a British film producer, founder of Red Box Films and co-founder of Lightbox. He produced a number of feature documentaries, including Man on Wire and Searching for Sugar Man, both winners of the Academy Award for Best Documentary Feature Film.

He went to school with Louis Theroux and he produced the documentary My Scientology Movie written by Theroux.  Chinn's brother, Jonathan, is a television producer.

Filmography
 Curse of the Chippendales (2021) – Executive Producer
 Tina (2021) – Producer
 The Amazing Johnathan Documentary (2019) – Executive Producer
 LA 92 (2017) – Producer
 Captive (2016) (TV series) – Executive Producer
 My Scientology Movie (2015) – Producer
 The Green Prince (2014) – Producer
 The Legend of Shorty (2014) – Producer 
 Garnet's Gold (2014) – Producer 
 Signal To Noise (2014) (TV series) – Executive Producer, 1 Episode 
 Everything or Nothing (2012) – Producer
 The Imposter (2012) – Executive Producer 
 Searching for Sugar Man (2012) – Producer 
 Project Nim (2011) – Producer 
 Man on Wire (2008) – Producer 
 To Be First (2007) – Producer 
 The Government Inspector (2005) – Co-Producer 
 America Beyond the Color Line with Henry Louis Gates Jr. (2002) (TV series) – Series Producer 
 Frontline (2004) (TV Series) – Cinematographer, Episode The Invasion of Iraq 
 Smallpox 2002: Silent Weapon (2002) – Writer, Producer
 War In Europe (2000) – Associate Producer
 On Air (1998) (TV series) – Executive Producer
 The Feel Good Factor (1997) (TV series) – Associate Producer

References

External links
 
 Red Box Films
 Lightbox

Directors of Best Documentary Feature Academy Award winners
British film producers
Living people
Year of birth missing (living people)